Flavius David Daniliuc (born 27 April 2001) is an Austrian professional footballer who plays as a centre-back for Italian  club Salernitana.

Club career

Early years and Bayern Munich
Daniliuc began his youth career with Admira Wacker Mödling, before moving to Rapid Wien in 2010. The following year, he joined the junior academy of Spanish club Real Madrid, where he won a youth league title. His international transfer was one of the cases which resulted in the transfer ban imposed on Real Madrid by FIFA in 2016.

After being bullied by his colleagues in Spain, Daniliuc moved to Germany in 2014 on the advice of Bayern Munich defender and fellow countryman David Alaba, who Daniliuc's father had met. He first entered the DFI Bad Aibling youth team, before joining the Bayern Munich youth academy in January 2015. In October 2018, Daniliuc was included in The Guardians "Next Generation 2018", which listed the 60 most talented footballers born in 2001. He made his professional debut for Bayern Munich II in the 3. Liga on 26 July 2019, starting in a home match with KFC Uerdingen.

Nice

On 18 June 2020, French club Nice announced the signing of 19-year-old Daniliuc from Bayern Munich. He recorded his Ligue 1 debut on 20 September that year, entering the field in the 65th minute of a 3–0 home defeat to Paris Saint-Germain, and his first European game on 5 November, in a 3–2 UEFA Europa League away loss to Slavia Prague.

Daniliuc scored his first senior goal in a 2–1 victory over Rennes at the Roazhon Park, on 26 February 2021.

Salernitana
On 29 August 2022, Daniliuc signed a four-year contract with Salernitana in Italy.

International career
Daniliuc began his international youth career with the under-15 team of Austria in October 2015 against Montenegro. He advanced through the under-16 and under-17 teams in 2016 and 2017. On 19 November 2018, he made his under-18 debut in a friendly match against the Czech Republic, which finished in a 1–0 loss.

Personal life
Daniliuc was born in Vienna, Austria, to Romanian parents from Suceava who fled their home country before the fall of Communism. His older twin brothers, Daniel and Manuel, are also footballers.

Career statistics

Honours 
Nice

 Coupe de France runner-up: 2021–22

References

External links
 
 Profile at DFB.de
 Profile at kicker.de
 
 

2001 births
Living people
Footballers from Vienna
Austrian footballers
Austria under-21 international footballers
Austria youth international footballers
Austrian people of Romanian descent
Association football central defenders
3. Liga players
FC Bayern Munich II players
Ligue 1 players
OGC Nice players
U.S. Salernitana 1919 players
Austrian expatriate footballers
Expatriate footballers in Spain
Austrian expatriate sportspeople in Spain
Expatriate footballers in Germany
Austrian expatriate sportspeople in Germany
Expatriate footballers in France
Austrian expatriate sportspeople in France
Expatriate footballers in Italy
Austrian expatriate sportspeople in Italy